Women Without Names (Italian: Donne senza nome) is 1950 Italian drama film directed by Géza von Radványi and starring Simone Simon, Vivi Gioi, and Françoise Rosay. It is set in a displaced-persons camp after the Second World War, and was filmed at the Cinecittà Studios in Rome. The film's sets were designed by the art directors Piero Filippone and Dario Cecchi.

Partial cast
 Simone Simon as Yvonne Dubois
 Vivi Gioi as Greta
 Irasema Dilian as Janka Nowotska
 Gino Cervi as brigadiere Pietro Zanini
 Valentina Cortese as Anna Petrovic
 Mario Ferrari as Capitano
 Umberto Spadaro as Pietro
 Françoise Rosay as la contessa
 Eva Breuer as Christine Obear
 Gina Falckenberg as Hida von Schwartzendorf
 Carlo Sposito as Ciulian
 Liliana Tellini as Prisoner

References

Bibliography
 Van Heuckelom. Polish Migrants in European Film 1918–2017. Springer, 2019.

External links 
 

1950 films
Italian black-and-white films
1950s Italian-language films
1950 drama films
Films directed by Géza von Radványi
Films shot at Cinecittà Studios
Films with screenplays by René Barjavel
Italian drama films
1950s Italian films